"Without You" is a romantic song written by the American songwriter and music producer Lamont Dozier, and recorded in 1987 as a duet by the R&B singers Peabo Bryson and Regina Belle. The song was the love theme from the comedy film Leonard Part 6, released the same year, and was also recorded for the Peabo Bryson album Positive, released in 1988, the only album that contains the original version of "Without You". The single was released in November 1987, and peaked at #8 on the Adult Contemporary Tracks, #14 on the R&B chart, #85 on the UK Singles, and #89 on the Billboard Hot 100, between 1987/1988.

"Without You" was the first duet recorded by Bryson and Belle, who recorded four songs together, and was also the first successful duet of the two. Another success the duo came in 1992 with "A Whole New World", the theme of the animated feature film Aladdin.

In addition to its original English version by Bryson and Belle, "Without You" also received two adaptations in different languages. The first was in Portuguese sing by Rosanah Fiengo and the second was in Spanish, in 1989 and 1990, respectively. Both adaptations received the title "Amor Dividido", and were recorded by the same Brazilian singer. The adaptation in Portuguese was a success in Brazil in 1989.

Music video
"Without You" has no official video clip, only a video with a presentation of Peabo Bryson and Regina Belle in the American musical variety television program Soul Train in 1987, presented by American television show host Don Cornelius.

Description
"Without You" was composed by Lamont Dozier to be the love theme in Leonard Part 6, released in the United States on December 18, 1987, and the film starred Bill Cosby in the lead role. That same year, Regina Belle released her first album, All by Myself, but "Without You" was not included on the album. In 2012, All by Myself was remastered on CD and "Without You" was included at the end of the album as a bonus track, however, it was not the original 1987 version, but a "single mix" of the song. "Without You" was not included in any of Belle's other albums, nor in her compilations. Unlike her, Bryson included the song on his album Positive, released in 1988, the only album that contains the original version of "Without You", which was also included in his compilations Anthology, released in 2001, and Bedroom Classics Vol. 2 – Peabo Bryson, released in 2004. On every album that the song is present, it is titled "Without You (Love Theme from Leonard Part 6)", but its title is only "Without You". It was the first of four duets recorded by Peabo Bryson and Regina Belle, who recorded together "Without You" (in 1987), "I Can't Imagine" (in 1991), "A Whole New World" (in 1992) and "Total Praise" (in 2009).

Track listing

Chart positions

Weekly charts

B-side
The B-side of the original single contains the song "The Higher You Climb", which had been recorded by Bryson only in 1986. It was written and produced by himself, with co-production from Dwight Watkins, and released on his album Quiet Storm in the same year. It was a simple song from their album that was not released as a single.

Personnel

Credits
Writer – Lamont Dozier
Lead Vocals – Peabo Bryson, Regina Belle
Producer – Michael J. Powell, Sir Gant
Arranged By (Backing Vocals) – Michael J. Powell, Sir Gant
Arranged By (Strings) – George Del Barrio
Arranged By (Backing Vocals) – Cindy Mizelle
Backing Vocals – Cindy Mizelle, Jim Gilstrap, Bunny Hull, Marva King, Valerie Pinkston-Mayo
Guitar – Michael J. Powell
Piano Acoustic – Sir Gant
Bass – Anthony Jackson
Drums – Steve Ferrone
Engineer – Barney Perkins
Engineer (Assistant) – Andrew Spiegelman, Elliott Peters, Gerard Smerek, Milton Chan
Synthesizer (Synclavier) – Sir Gant
Programmed By (Synclavier) – Gary Barlough
Recorded By – Barney Perkins
Recorded By (Additional) – Keith Seppanen
Mixed By – Barney Perkins

Companies
Recorded & Mixed at:
Yamaha R&D Studio, Glendale, California
Additional recording at:
Ambience Recorders, Farmington Hills, Michigan
Electric Lady Studios, New York City, New York
Mastered at:
Bernie Grundman Mastering

Final Notes
℗ 1987, Columbia Pictures Industries, Inc.
 1988, Elektra Records / Asylum Records for the United States and WEA International Inc. for the world outside of the United States.
From Elektra LP Positive, 1988 (Peabo Bryson album).
Regina Belle appears courtesy of CBS Records (Columbia Records).

Alternative single
"Without You" features an alternative version of its single. In this version, "Without You" has edited a smaller duration, with different cover and B-side. The cover of this version contains only the "Without You" (large size) and "If Ever You're in My Arms Again" (small size) titles, with a background in dark green and light green letters. In this version, "Without You" is only 4:30 long, an edited version of the single, while the original single is 5:14 in duration. The B-side of this alternative version is the song "If Ever You're in My Arms Again", a big hit for Bryson, originally recorded in 1984, and released as a single and included on his album Straight from the Heart the same year. The duration of 4:02 was also edited since the original version of the album has a duration of 4:14. The track list of this alternative single of "Without You" is as follows:

Promotional single
"Without You" includes a promotional version of their single. This version has only "Without You", on both sides of the single. The A-side contains the edited version of the single, lasting 4:30, launched an alternative version. The B-side has the original full version with 5:14 duration. The cover of this version is also different, in red and black colors, the design of a phonograph needle on black over red background and the name "ELEKTRA" in big letters in white on black background. This track list is as follows:

Portuguese version
In 1989, "Without You" won a Portuguese version in Brazil, recorded by the Brazilian singer Rosana, (today also known as Rosanah Fiengo) titled "Amor Dividido". The version was released on her album Onde o Amor Me Leva in the same year. The Portuguese lyrics were written by the Brazilian composer Cláudio Rabello. "Amor Dividido" had an official video and it was a big hit in Brazil in 1989, long run on radio and Rosana leading to many TV shows. The song credits are Lamont Dozier, version Cláudio Rabello.

Spanish version
In 1990, Rosana recorded a special album with songs in English and Spanish, launched in Latin America, entitled Por Donde El Amor Me Lleva. This had another version of "Without You" by Rosana, this time in Spanish, in duet with the Spanish singer Emmanuel. The release was also titled "Amor Dividido", with letters in Spanish, written by the composer Karen Guindi, based on the lyrics in Portuguese, which had been written by the Brazilian composer Claudio Rabello in 1989. This version of "Without You" in Spanish was also included in a singer's album Emmanuel, entitled Vida, also released in 1990. The song credits are Lamont Dozier, version Cláudio Rabello, adaptation Karen Guindi.

References

External links
 "Without You" on Letras.mus: https://www.letras.mus.br/peabo-bryson/1256336/
 .
 [ "Without You" by Peabo Bryson and Regina Belle] no AllMusic.

1987 songs
1987 singles
1980s ballads
Soul ballads
Contemporary R&B ballads
Songs written by Lamont Dozier
Peabo Bryson songs
Regina Belle songs
Elektra Records singles
Male–female vocal duets
Song recordings produced by Michael J. Powell